The 1992 Firestone Indy Lights Championship consisted of 12 races. American Robbie Buhl captured a single victory on his way to the championship. This was the last season where all chassis were supplied by March.

Calendar

Race summaries

Phoenix race
Held April 5 at Phoenix International Raceway. Franck Fréon won the pole.

Top Five Results
 Adrian Fernández
 Robbie Groff
 Robbie Buhl
 Marco Greco
 Tommy Byrne

Long Beach race
Held April 12 at Long Beach, California Street Course. Franck Fréon won the pole.

Top Five Results
 Franck Fréon
 Robbie Groff
 Robbie Buhl
 Marco Greco
 Sandy Brody

Detroit race
Held June 7 at Belle Isle Raceway. Adrian Fernández won the pole.

Top Five Results
 Adrian Fernández
 Robbie Buhl
 Mark Smith
 Tommy Byrne
 Franck Fréon

Portland race
Held June 21 at Portland International Raceway. Franck Fréon won the pole.

Top Five Results
 Franck Fréon
 Robbie Buhl
 Tommy Byrne
 Robbie Groff
 Sandy Brody

Milwaukee race
Held June 28 at The Milwaukee Mile. Adrian Fernández won the pole.

Top Five Results
 Adrian Fernández
 Robbie Groff
 Robbie Buhl
 Franck Fréon
 Mark Smith

Loudon race
Held July 5 at New Hampshire International Speedway. Adrian Fernández won the pole.

Top Five Results
 Adrian Fernández
 Franck Fréon
 Robbie Buhl
 Bryan Herta
 Dave Kudrave

Toronto race
Held July 19 at Exhibition Place. Mark Smith won the pole.

Top Five Results
 Bryan Herta
 Robbie Buhl
 Marco Greco
 Sandy Brody
 Robbie Groff

Cleveland race
Held August 9 at Burke Lakefront Airport. Robbie Buhl won the pole.

Top Five Results
 Franck Fréon
 Bryan Herta
 Robbie Buhl
 Mike Snow
 Sandy Brody

Vancouver race
Held August 30 at Pacific Place. Robbie Buhl won the pole.

Top Five Results
 Mark Smith
 Robbie Buhl
 Sandy Brody
 Franck Fréon
 Bryan Herta

Mid-Ohio race
Held September 13 at The Mid-Ohio Sports Car Course. Franck Fréon won the pole.

Top Five Results
 Robbie Groff
 Fredrik Ekblom
 Robbie Buhl
 Bryan Herta
 Adrian Fernández

Nazareth race
Held October 4 at Nazareth Speedway. Robbie Buhl won the pole.

Top Five Results
 Robbie Buhl
 Franck Fréon
 Bryan Herta
 Robbie Groff
 Mark Smith

Laguna Seca race
Held October 18 at Mazda Raceway Laguna Seca. Robbie Groff won the pole.

Top Five Results
 Robbie Groff
 Bryan Herta
 Franck Fréon
 Robbie Buhl
 Adrian Fernández

Final points standings

Driver

For every race the points were awarded: 20 points to the winner, 16 for runner-up, 14 for third place, 12 for fourth place, 10 for fifth place, 8 for sixth place, 6 seventh place, winding down to 1 points for 12th place. Additional points were awarded to the pole winner (1 point) and to the driver leading the most laps (1 point).

Complete Overview

R12=retired, but classified NS=did not start

References 

Indy Lights seasons
Indy Lights Season, 1992
Indy Lights